A hexalogy (from Greek ἑξα- hexa-, "six" and -λογία -logia, "discourse") is a compound literary or narrative work that is made up of six distinct works. The word apparently first appeared in English as a borrowing from German, in discussions of August Bungert's Wagnerian opera cycle entitled Homerische Welt based on the Iliad and the Odyssey. (He planned two tetralogies, but the third and fourth operas of the eight were never written.) Both pentalogie and hexalogie were used by Théophile Gautier in 1859. In 1923 the word was applied by an American reviewer to Johannes V. Jensen's The Long Journey.

Examples
Examples of works that have been described as hexalogies are as follows:

Video games
Mega Man for the NES (1987–1994)

See also
 List of feature film series with six entries

References

 
Musical forms
Narrative forms
Literary series
Film series